Achilleas (Αχιλλέας Καϊμακλίου) is a Cypriot basketball club founded in 1943, nowadays running basketball, volleyball and table tennis divisions. It has been a part of the community in the suburb of Kaimakli in Nicosia. The club is named after Achilles (Ἀχιλλεύς) a legendary figure of the Greek mythology.

Basketball
The Men's basketball division was one of the founding clubs of the Cyprus Basketball Federation. In terms of trophies Achilleas has won the Cyprus Basketball League five times, making it the 3rd most successful team on the island to date behind EKA AEL and APOEL. Through their domestic successes they have represented the island in several European competitions such as the Korać Cup (in 1999 and 2001), the Saporta Cup in 2000 and the Euroleague (historically The European Champions Cup). Several of Achilleas' players have been selected for the men's Cyprus national basketball team.

The Women's basketball division competes in the Cyprus Women's Basketball League – First division. It has also represented Cyprus in European competitions.

Home games are played at the indoor Pallouriotisa Arena which only has a capacity for about 1,000 fans. The proximity of fans to the playing field has given it a reputation as an intimidating and tough home ground for away teams.

Roster

Notable players

Volleyball
The Men's volleyball division was one of the founding members of the Cyprus Volleyball Federation. It currently competes in the Cyprus Men's Volleyball Second division.

Honours

Men's Basketball
Cyprus Basketball Division 1
Winner (5): 1974–75, 1976–77, 1983–84, 1985–86, 1992–93
Runner Up (6): 1986–87, 1988–89, 1989–90, 1991–92, 1996–97, 1998–99
Cyprus Men's Basketball Cup:
Winner (7): 1973–74, 1974–75, 1975–76, 1976–77, 1987–88, 1989–90, 1999–2000
Runner-up (4): 1980–81, 1981–82, 1982–83, 1983–84, 2009–10
 Cyprus Men's Basketball Supercup
Winner (4): 1990, 1992, 1993, 1996

Women's Basketball
Cyprus Basketball Women's League – Division 1
Winner (1):  1986–87
Runner Up (1): 2000–01, 2009–10
Cyprus Women's Basketball Cup:
Winner (1): 2006–07
Runner-up (4): 1999–00, 2000–01, 2001–02, 2008–09

Football

Achilleas Kaimakli FC was a Cypriot football club based in Kaimakli, Nicosia. Founded in 1957, was playing sometimes in Second, in Third and in Fourth Division. The team dissolved after 1988.

References

External links
 Official homepage

 
Basketball teams in Cyprus
Volleyball clubs in Cyprus
Sport in Nicosia
Basketball teams established in 1943
1943 establishments in Cyprus